The Mackintosh Man is a 1973 British Cold War neo noir spy thriller film, directed by John Huston and starring Paul Newman, Dominique Sanda and James Mason.

Huston called it "a spy thriller with some amusing moments" that was similar to his earlier The Kremlin Letter.

Plot
Joseph Rearden, a British Intelligence agent, arrives in London and makes a rendezvous with Mackintosh, the head of his organisation, in a discreet office located just off Trafalgar Square. Mackintosh and his deputy, Mrs Smith, inform him of a simple way to steal diamonds which are transported via the postal service to avoid attention. This he does, apparently getting successfully away after punching a postman, and making off with the diamond-filled parcel. However, that evening, in his hotel room he is paid a visit by two Metropolitan Police detectives who have received an anonymous phone call advising them about the robbery. They are unconvinced by Rearden's pretence to be an innocent Australian who has recently arrived in London.

The judge at his trial is angered by the failure to recover the stolen diamonds from Rearden, who he believes has stashed them away somewhere, and sentences him to twenty years in jail. Rearden is shipped off to HM Prison Chelmsford. He slowly begins to blend in with the other prisoners, and is assigned to laundry-washing duties. A few days after entering he encounters Slade, a former British intelligence officer kept in high security after having been exposed as a KGB mole. He makes innocent enquiries of his fellow inmates about Slade, but not a great deal is known about him.

A few weeks later, he is approached by a well-spoken inmate who offers to act as a go-between with an organisation which can spring him from the prison in exchange for a large cut of the stolen diamonds. They are used to helping prisoners escape, and have another exit planned shortly, which he can join, if he is prepared to put up the money, to which he agrees. Two days later a diversion is arranged, and smoke bombs are hurled over the walls. Using the smoke screen Rearden and a fellow prisoner, who turns out to be Slade, are lifted over the walls by a cargo net and driven away at high speed. They are then drugged by injection, and taken to a secret location, somewhere in wild, deserted countryside. When Slade and Rearden awake, they are told they will be kept there for a week until the hunt for them dies down.

In London, Mackintosh discreetly monitors the progress of Rearden. His entry into prison has been a planned sting operation to smoke out the organisation. It is now intended they will be raided, rounded up and Slade returned to prison. Following a speech attacking the handling of the Slade escape by an old friend and war comrade, Sir George Wheeler MP in the House of Commons, Mackintosh approaches him and advises him it would be better to remain silent or risk embarrassing himself. Wheeler, however, despite masquerading as a staunchly patriotic right-winger, is actually a Communist and an agent of the KGB. He immediately tips off the head of the organisation where Rearden is being held. Mackintosh had suspected Wheeler and had used their meeting to try to flush him out. Before Mackintosh can act, he is run down by a car and dies soon afterwards.

In the meantime, Rearden falls under suspicion by the escape organisation. Doubting his claims to be an Australian criminal, they beat him violently and savage him with a guard dog. Eventually, he manages to fight back and escape the building, setting it on fire. He makes out across country, pursued by his guards and the dog. He is finally forced to drown the dog in a stream to throw his assailants off the scent. He then makes it to a nearby town, where he discovers he is on the west coast of Ireland and has apparently been staying on the estate of a close friend of Sir George Wheeler. He contacts Mrs Smith in London, who flies to meet him in Galway. Realising that Slade has been smuggled out of Ireland on the private yacht of Wheeler, they now head to Valletta, Malta, where Wheeler is heading.

Once in Malta, they try to infiltrate one of Wheeler's parties and discover the whereabouts of Slade. Wheeler soon recognises Mrs Smith — the daughter of his old friend Mackintosh — drugs her, and takes her aboard his yacht. Rearden tries to get the Maltese police to raid the boat, but they refuse to believe that a respected man as Wheeler can be involved in kidnapping and treason, so instead they move to arrest Rearden, who is still a wanted man for his earlier faked diamond robbery. So, Rearden is again forced to flee, but manages to follow Wheeler to a church where he and Slade are holding Mrs Smith. He pulls a gun on them, and orders them to hand over Mrs Smith. Presented with a Mexican standoff, Wheeler and Slade try to persuade Rearden to let them go unharmed, in return for which they will also spare him and Mrs Smith. Reluctantly Rearden agrees, but Mrs Smith takes up a gun and shoots Slade and Wheeler, avenging the murder of her father. She has fulfilled her orders and bitterly abandons Rearden, angry at the way he has not followed his own orders.

Cast

 Paul Newman as Joseph Rearden
 Dominique Sanda as Mrs Smith
 James Mason as Sir George Wheeler MP
 Harry Andrews as Mackintosh
 Ian Bannen as Slade
 Michael Hordern as Brown
 Nigel Patrick as Soames-Trevelyan
 Peter Vaughan as Inspector Brunskill
 Roland Culver as The Judge
 Percy Herbert as Taafe
 Robert Lang as Jack Summers
 Leo Genn as Rollins
 Jenny Runacre as Gerda
 John Bindon as Buster
 Hugh Manning as The Prosecutor
 Wolfe Morris as Malta Police Commissioner
 Noel Purcell as O'Donovan
 Donald Webster as Jervis
 Keith Bell as Palmer
 Niall MacGinnis as Warder
 Eddie Byrne as Fisherman
 Shane Briant as Cox
 Michael Poole as Mr Boyd
 Eric Mason as The Postman
 Ronald Clarke as Attendant
 Antony Viccars as Salesman
 Dinny Powell as Young
 Douglas Robinson as Danahoe
 Jack Cooper as 1st Motor Cyclist
 Marc Boyle as 2nd Motor Cyclist
 Marcelle Castillo as Madeleine
 Nosher Powell as Armed Guard
 Terry Plummer as Dark Man
 Joe Cahill as 1st Guard
 Gerry Alexander as 2nd Guard
 John McDarby as Old Man at Bus Stop
 Donal McCann as 1st Fireman
 Joe Lynch as 1st Garda
 Seamus Healy as Countryman in Pub
 Tom Irwin as 2nd Fireman
 Pascal Perry as 2nd Garda
 Steve Brennan as Pub Customer
 Vernon Hayden as Pub Customer
 Brendon O'Duill as Pub Customber

Production

Scripting
The script was written by Walter Hill who later recalled it as an unhappy experience. He was having a legal dispute with Warner Bros over the fact they had sold his script for Hickey & Boggs to United Artists without paying Hill any extra money. As a compromise, Warners sent Hill some novels they had optioned and offered to pay for him to write the script for one. He selected The Freedom Trap by Desmond Bagley. The 1971 novel was loosely based on the exposure and defection of George Blake, a Soviet mole in MI6. Author Hill says, "I wrote a quick script which I was not particularly enamored with myself" and "much to my shock and surprise" Paul Newman agreed to star and John Huston wanted to direct. Newman's producing partner John Foreman would produce. The film was financed by Warners as part of the slate of films for Dick Shepherd.

"One would like to think you are mistaken about the wonders of your work, but I didn't believe it," said Hill. "That part turned out to be true."

Hill worked on the script with Huston and says the director was ill. Although Hill ended up with sole screen credit, he says, "I wrote 90% of the first half, various people wrote the rest. I didn't think it was a very good film."

William Fairchild was one of the uncredited writers on the script.

Shooting
According to a contemporary article on the making of the film, the script was not completed two weeks into shooting.

The film was shot in England, Republic of Ireland and Malta. The scene in which Slade and Rearden escape from prison was inspired by Blake's escape from Wormwood Scrubs in 1966. The jail scenes were filmed at Liverpool Prison and Kilmainham Gaol in Dublin, Ireland.

The house where Slade and Rearden stay after their escape is Ardfry house, Oranmore, county Galway, Ireland, an abandoned castle in ruins.

The scene in which Rearden realises that Slade is on board Wheeler's yacht was shot at Roundstone, County Galway, Ireland.

Reception
The film received a mixed reception when it was released, and did not perform well at the box office in the United Kingdom, United States or Canada. David Robinson, reviewer for The Times, found the story a very predictable and typical espionage thriller, while the direction by John Huston still made it watchable because of Huston's gift for storytelling. Variety wrote it was "a tame tale of British espionage and counter-espionage", and added that "there's a whole lot of nothing going on here." The Hollywood Reporter called it "a good genre film in the ice cold vein of The Maltese Falcon", and though "it isn't nearly as rich nor fine as that early Huston classic but tells an interesting story with a sure sense of atmosphere, location and supporting characters." Roger Ebert wrote it was "perhaps the first anti-spy movie", as it "seems to have been made by a group of people with no sympathy or understanding for spy movies." Time Out called it a "reasonably entertaining old-fashioned thriller" "if you can accept Newman as a totally unconvincing Australian..., an appalling array of accents (mainly Irish), and Dominique Sanda as an unlikely member of the British Secret Service."

Walter Hill says he never saw the final product, but was told it was "a real bomb".

See also
 List of American films of 1973

References

External links
 
 

Warner Bros. films
1973 films
British spy thriller films
1970s spy thriller films
Films directed by John Huston
1970s English-language films
Irish-language films
Cold War spy films
Films based on British novels
Films based on thriller novels
Films set in Ireland
Films set in England
Films set in London
Films set in Malta
Films shot in Malta
Films shot in Ireland
Films scored by Maurice Jarre
Films with screenplays by Walter Hill
1970s British films